Dashtak Dishmuk (also Romanized as Dashtak Dīshmūk; also known as Dashtak) is a village in Bahmayi-ye Sarhadi-ye Sharqi Rural District, Dishmok District, Kohgiluyeh County, Kohgiluyeh and Boyer-Ahmad Province, Iran. At the 2006 census, its population was 378, in 61 families.

References 

Populated places in Kohgiluyeh County